The men's 100 metre freestyle competition at the 1993 Pan Pacific Swimming Championships took place on August 13 at the Port Island Sports Center.  The last champion was Matt Biondi of USA.

This race consisted of two lengths of the pool, both lengths being in freestyle.

Records
Prior to this competition, the existing world and Pan Pacific records were as follows:

Results
All times are in minutes and seconds.

Heats
The first round was held on August 13.

B Final 
The B final was held on August 13.

A Final 
The A final was held on August 13.

References

1993 Pan Pacific Swimming Championships